The 2005–06 Heineken Cup was the eleventh edition of the European Heineken Cup rugby union club tournament. 24 teams from 7 countries took part, with the opening game played on Friday October 21, 2005. Munster won the tournament, beating Biarritz in the final held at Millennium Stadium, Cardiff, on 20 May 2006.

The teams were divided into six pools of four, in which teams played home and away matches against each other. The winners of the pools, together with the two best runners-up, qualified for the knock-out stage.

Format
In the pool matches, teams receive:
 four points for a win
 two points for a draw
 a bonus point for scoring four or more tries
 a bonus point for losing by seven or fewer points

Ties between two teams are broken in the following order:
 Match points earned in head-to-head matches. For example, if tied teams are in the same pool, and split their head-to-head matches, but one team earned a bonus point and the other failed to do so, the team that earned the bonus point will win. Munster won a tiebreaker over Sale Sharks in Pool 1 in this very manner.
 Tries scored in head-to-head matches.
 Point difference in head-to-head matches.
 Tries scored in all pool matches. This is the first tiebreaker between teams in different pools, which can come into play for determining seeding among first-place teams, or breaking ties among second-place teams.
 Point difference in all pool matches.
 Best disciplinary record in pool play. The team with the fewest players sent off or sin-binned during pool play wins.
 Coin toss.

The quarterfinals are seeded from 1 to 8. The six pool winners receive the top six seeds, based on their point totals. The top two-second-place finishers are seeded 7 and 8. The seeds of the qualifying teams are in parentheses next to their names in the tables.

Teams

Pool stage
Full results can be found at 2005–06 Heineken Cup pool stage.
All times are local to the match location.

Pool 1

Note: Munster took first place over Sale Sharks on competition points in head-to-head matches, 5–4.

Pool 2

Pool 3

Pool 4

Pool 5

Pool 6

Seeding and runners-up

Knockout stage

Quarter-finals

Semi-finals

Final

Statistics

Top point scorers
 131 – Felipe Contepomi (Leinster)
115 – Ronan O'Gara (Munster)
99 – Andy Goode (Leicester Tigers)

Top try scorers
 6 – Sireli Bobo (Biarritz Olympique)
 6 – Vincent Clerc (Toulouse)
 6 – Felipe Contepomi (Leinster)

External links
 ERC Rugby

 
Heineken Cup seasons
Heineken
Heineken
Heineken
Heineken
Heineken
Heineken